The men's 10,000 metres in speed skating at the 1972 Winter Olympics took place on 7 February, at the Makomanai Open Stadium.

Records
Prior to this competition, the existing world and Olympic records were as follows:

The following new World and  Olympic records was set during the competition.

Results

References

Men's speed skating at the 1972 Winter Olympics